The FIL World Luge Natural Track Championships 1998 took place in Rautavaara, Finland. It marked the first time the championships were held outside the traditional locations of Austria, Germany, or Italy.

Men's singles

Reinhard Gruber ended Gerhard Pilz's reign of five straight World Championships in men's singles natural track luge.

Women's singles

Panyutina won her third medal of the championships in the 1990s representing her third different country (1990: bronze for the Soviet Union, 1992: gold for the Commonwealth of Independent States).

Men's doubles

Medal table

References
Men's doubles natural track World Champions
Men's singles natural track World Champions
Women's singles natural track World Champions

FIL World Luge Natural Track Championships
1998 in luge
1998 in Finnish sport
Luge in Finland